Sir Herbert Richard Churton Wild  (20 September 1912 – 22 May 1978) was the ninth Chief Justice of New Zealand.

Family
Wild was born in Blenheim in 1912. His father, Leonard Wild, was at that time science teacher at Marlborough High School. He attended Feilding Agricultural High School. His sister Dora later married the jurist John White. His son, John Wild, was a judge at the High Court and then the Court of Appeal.

Chief justice
He famously decided the case of Fitzgerald v Muldoon in 1976.

Wild was diagnosed with a brain tumour in 1977. He resigned as Chief Justice in early 1978 and died shortly after.

References

1912 births
1978 deaths
New Zealand Knights Commander of the Order of St Michael and St George
New Zealand Knights Grand Cross of the Order of the British Empire
20th-century New Zealand judges
Victoria University of Wellington alumni
People from Blenheim, New Zealand
Chief justices of New Zealand
High Court of New Zealand judges
Members of the Judicial Committee of the Privy Council
New Zealand Army officers
New Zealand King's Counsel
Solicitors-General of New Zealand
People educated at Feilding High School
New Zealand members of the Privy Council of the United Kingdom